Ray of Light Theatre is a musical theatre company in San Francisco.

History
Ray of Light Theatre was started by the founding artistic director, Shane Ray, and founding board co-chair, Adrienne Abrams, in 2000.

Production highlights & honors:

In 2005, 2 Broke Girls star Beth Behrs appeared as Sandy Dumbrowski in the musical Grease.

In 2005, ROLT produced Bat Boy: The Musical, directed by Broadway star James Monroe Iglehart (Aladdin, Memphis the Musical, 25th Annual Putnam County Spelling Bee).

In 2007, the company produced the San Francisco premiere of Disney's High School Musical on Stage!.

In 2008, Ray of Light Theatre's The Rocky Horror Show was nominated for five BATCC awards and received critical acclaim.

In 2009, the month-long run of The Who's Tommy garnered six Bay Area Theatre Critics Circle Awards (of eleven nods).

In 2010, ROLT mounted the West Coast Premiere of Jerry Springer: The Opera at the Victoria Theatre in San Francisco.

In 2011, the ROLT production of Assassins was nominated for 13 BATCC awards, winning 8, including Best Musical.

In 2012, the ROLT production of Sweeney Todd was nominated for 6 BATCC awards, winning best featured actress.

In 2013, ROLT produced the Bay Area Premiere of Carrie.

In 2014, ROLT worked with Urinetown writers, Greg Kotis and Mark Hollmann on developing their new musical, Yeast Nation.

In 2015, ROLT produced the Bay Area Premiere of Heathers the Musical and worked with writers Tim Maner, Steven Cheslik-deMeyer and Alan Stevens Hewitt on producing Lizzie the Musical.

Previous shows
Season 1 (2001/2002):
 You're a Good Man, Charlie Brown

Season 2 (2002/2003):
 Joseph and the Amazing Technicolor Dreamcoat
 Schoolhouse Rock! Live Jr. (ROLT Jr.)
 The Wizard of Oz in Concert

Season 3 (2003/2004):
 Into the Woods
 You're a Good Man, Charlie Brown (ROLT Jr.)

Season 4 (2004/2005):

 Broadway Gala - An Evening of Stephens
 Honk!
 Grease
 Fiddler on the Roof Jr. (ROLT Jr.)

Season 5 (2005/2006):

 Bat Boy: The Musical
 Seussical
 Broadway Gala: A Little Bit in Love
 The Last Five Years
 Annie Jr.  (ROLT Jr.)

Season 6 (2006/2007):
 Bat Boy: The Musical
 Broadway Gala: ROLT's Fifth Anniversary Gala
 The Secret Garden in Concert
 Songs for a New World
 The Music Man Jr. (ROLT Jr.)

Season 7 (2007/2008):
 Disney's High School Musical on Stage!
 The Wizard of Oz (ROLT Jr.)

Season 8 (2008/2009):
 The Rocky Horror Show
 I Love You, You're Perfect, Now Change
 Beauty and the Beast Jr. (ROLT Jr.)

Season 9 (2009/2010):
 The Who's Tommy
 Baby: A Musical
 Honk! Jr. (ROLT Jr.)

Season 10: 2010/2011:
 Jerry Springer: The Opera
 Alice in Wonderland Jr. (ROLT Jr.)
 
Season 11 (2011): 
 Assassins

Season 12 (2012):
 The Full Monty
 Sweeney Todd

Season 13 (2013):
 Into the Woods
 Carrie

Season 14 (2014):
 Triassic Parq
 Yeast Nation

Season 15 (2015):
 Heathers: The Musical
 Lizzie the Musical
 The Rocky Horror Show

Season 16 (2016):
 The Wild Party (Lippa Musical)
 Little Shop of Horrors (musical)
 The Rocky Horror Show

Season 17 (2017):
 Silence! The Musical
 Reefer Madness (musical)
 The Rocky Horror Show

Season 18 (2018):
 Jesus Christ Superstar (All female cast)
 Hedwig and the Angry Inch (musical)
 The Rocky Horror Show

Season 19 (2019):
 American Psycho (musical)
 Caroline, or Change
 The Rocky Horror Show

References

External links
Ray of Light Theatre  (Official Website)

Theatre companies in San Francisco